Marton railway station was a railway station serving  Marton in the English county of Warwickshire on the Rugby to Leamington line.

Among the many schemes to build a line between Rugby and Leamington was one by the Rugby, Leamington and Warwick Railway Company.  This later became known as the Rugby and Leamington Railway and received royal assent on 13 August 1846.  The undertaking was sold to the London and North Western Railway on 17 November 1846 and the line opened on 1 March 1851.

Marton station was situated half-a-mile south of the village it served on the road to Long Itchington (now the A423). The brick-built station buildings were on the Down (Leamington-bound) side of the line.

Marton station closed to passenger traffic on 15 June 1959 and closed to freight in July 1961.

The rail bridge over the A423 was demolished in August 2022, removing the access to the former station permanently.

References

External links
 Marton Station on navigable 1954 O. S. map
 Marton Station on Warwickshire Railways
 LNWR Map

Railway stations in Great Britain opened in 1851
Railway stations in Great Britain closed in 1961
Disused railway stations in Warwickshire
Former London and North Western Railway stations
1851 establishments in England